Extracorporeal shockwave therapy (ESWT)  is a non-invasive, out-patient alternative to surgery for those with many joint and tendon disorders. ESWT sends acoustic shock waves into bone or soft tissue, in effect reinjuring the area on a cellular level and breaking up the scarring that has penetrated tendons and ligaments. The controlled reinjuring of tissue allows the body to regenerate blood vessels and bone cells. The resulting revascularization leads to faster healing and often a return to pre-injury activity levels. It is a treatment using powerful acoustic pulses which is mostly used to treat kidney stones and in physical therapy and orthopedics.

Medical uses

The most common use of extracorporeal shockwave therapy (ESWT) is for lithotripsy to treat kidney stones (urinary calculosis) and biliary calculi (stones in the gallbladder or in the liver) using an acoustic pulse. It is also reported to be used for salivary stones and pancreatic stones.

In the UK, the National Institute for Health and Care Excellence (NICE) found that the evidence for ESWT in the majority of indications is conflicting, as such ESWT should only be used where there are special arrangements for clinical governance and audit. Two 2017 reviews had similar findings, with moderate level evidence at best.

Extracorporeal shockwave therapy is used as a second line measure to treat tennis elbow,   shoulder rotator cuff pain, achilles tendinitis, plantar fasciitis, and greater trochanteric pain syndrome.

ESWT is also used to promote bone healing and treat bone necrosis. It is an effective alternative to surgical treatment of non-healing fractures.

ESWT is used for wound healing and has shown positive results in short-term and long-term outcomes in diabetic patients with foot ulcers. Randomised controlled trials into the use of ESWT for healing venous leg ulcers are needed as there is a lack of evidence in this area.

Procedure
The lithotriptor attempts to break up the stone with minimal collateral damage by using an externally applied, focused, high-intensity acoustic pulse. The patient is usually sedated or anesthetized for the procedure in order to help them remain still and reduce possible discomfort. Sedation is not required in its application for soft tissue injuries.

History
Beginning in 1969 and funded by the German Ministry of Defense, Dornier began a study of the effects of shock waves on tissue. In 1972, on the basis of preliminary studies performed by Dornier Medical Systems, an agreement was reached with Egbert Schmiedt, director of the urologic clinic at the University of Munich. The development of the Dornier lithotripter progressed through several prototypes, ultimately culminating in February 1980 with the first treatment of a human by SWL. The production and distribution of the Dornier HM3 lithotripter began in late 1983, and SWL was approved by the U.S. Food and Drug Administration in 1984.

In the 1980s people using ESWT for kidney stones noticed that it appeared to increase bone density in nearby bones, leading them to explore it for orthopedic purposes.

Research
In response to concerns raised by NICE, in 2012 a study called the Assessment of the Effectiveness of ESWT for Soft Tissue Injuries was launched (ASSERT).

As of 2018 use of ESWT had been studied as a potential treatment for chronic prostatitis/chronic pelvic pain syndrome in three small studies; there were short term improvements in symptoms and few adverse effects, but the medium term results are unknown, and the results are difficult to generalize due to low quality of the studies.

Veterinary use
ESWT is commonly used for treating orthopedic problems in horses, including tendon and ligament injuries, kissing spine, navicular syndrome, and arthritis. The evidence for these uses is weak.

Physiotherapy use
ESWT is used in physical therapy for pain reduction, increase in metabolism at the cellular level, revascularisation, and recovering normal muscle tone following various disorders. The use of ESWT was demonstrated in patients with frozen shoulders compared to therapeutic ultrasound with exercises.

Research suggests that ESWT can accelerate the blood flow, facilitating the healing of the inflamed Achilles tendon. In one study involving 23 patients with chronic achilles tendinopathy, 20 reported improvement in their condition and pain scores after ESWT; three saw no change, and none reported any worsening.

See also
 Laser lithotripsy

References

Medical treatments